The Drysdale is a New Zealand breed of sheep. It was developed from 1931 by Francis Dry, and derives from sheep of the New Zealand Romney breed in which a mutation caused the coat to be particularly hairy, and thus suitable for carpet-making. It is a specialised carpet wool breed, but also a useful meat breed.

History 
Francis Dry in 1931 noticed a genetic freak, a Romney ram with a high percentage of very coarse wool. The coarse wool gene causes both male and female Drysdales to be horned. The male's horn resembles a Wiltshire ram's horn whereas the ewe's horns are very small - usually only  in length. Live weight is 60-70 kg.

Characteristics

Use

References

Further reading 

Stephens, M (et al.), Handbook of Australian Livestock, Australian Meat & Livestock Export Corporation, 2000 (4th ed), 

Sheep breeds originating in New Zealand
Sheep breeds